Mervyn Francis Brooks (19 January 1919 – 19 August 2011) was an Australian rules football player who played two games for Fitzroy Football Club in 1943 and 1944. He also played for Preston in the Victorian Football Association (VFA).

References

External links 

1919 births
2011 deaths
Fitzroy Football Club players
Australian rules footballers from New South Wales
Preston Football Club (VFA) players
Australian blacksmiths